Thaworn Wiratchant (born 28 December 1966) is a Thai professional golfer who plays on the Asian Tour where he holds the record for most victories, with 18 total wins.

Professional career
Wiratchant's biggest win came in March 2005 when he won the Enjoy Jakarta Standard Chartered Indonesia Open. This event was co-sanctioned by the Asian Tour and the European Tour, meaning that Wiratchant became the second Thai after Thongchai Jaidee to win on the European Tour. He topped the Asian Tour money list in 2005, becoming the first player to win more than half a million U.S. dollars on that tour in a season. He also recorded what would have been the lowest aggregate score on the European Tour with a total of 255 strokes. However, this record is not considered official as preferred lies were in operation throughout the week.

Wiratchant won the Asian Tour money list again in 2012 after a solid season with three victories, including a playoff win over Scot Richie Ramsay at the Hero Indian Open.

Senior career
Wiratchant played in a number of events on the European Senior Tour in 2017, receiving an exemption for players aged exactly 50 who had previously won a European Tour event. In his second event on the tour, the WINSTONgolf Senior Open, he finished runner-up behind Phillip Price. He gained entry to the end-of-season MCB Tour Championship by being 23rd in the Order of Merit. Rounds of 66-65-62 gave him an eight strokes win over Mark McNulty. The win lifted him to 9th place on the end of season Order of Merit.

Professional wins (35)

European Tour wins (1)

1Co-sanctioned by the Asian Tour

Asian Tour wins (18)

*Note: The 2010 Yeangder Tournament Players Championship was shortened to 54 holes due to weather.
1Co-sanctioned by the European Tour

Asian Tour playoff record (2–1)

OneAsia Tour wins (1)

All Thailand Golf Tour wins (8)
2001 TPC Championships
2003 Singha Pattaya Open
2004 Singha Pattaya Open
2007 Singha Masters
2010 Singha E-San Open1
2014 Singha All Thailand Championship
2015 Singha E-San Open1
2020 Thongchai Jaidee Foundation
1Co-sanctioned by the ASEAN PGA Tour

ASEAN PGA Tour wins (4)

1Co-sanctioned by the All Thailand Golf Tour

European Senior Tour wins (2)

European Senior Tour playoff record (1–0)

Japan PGA Senior Tour wins (4)
2018 Sevenhills Cup KBC Senior Open
2019 Komatsu Open, Fujifilm Senior Championship
2021 Sumaiida Cup Senior Golf Tournament

Results in major championships

Note: Wiratchant never played in the U.S. Open or the PGA Championship.

CUT = missed the half-way cut
"T" = tied

Results in World Golf Championships

"T" = Tied
Note that the HSBC Champions did not become a WGC event until 2009.

Team appearances
Amateur
Eisenhower Trophy (representing Thailand): 1984

Professional
World Cup (representing Thailand): 1989, 1990
Dunhill Cup (representing Thailand): 1991, 1992
Dynasty Cup (representing Asia): 2003 (winners), 2005 (winners)
Royal Trophy (representing Asia): 2006, 2007

See also
List of golfers with most Asian Tour wins

References

External links

Thaworn Wiratchant
Asian Tour golfers
European Tour golfers
European Senior Tour golfers
Thaworn Wiratchant
1966 births
Living people